Super Dancer is an Indian Hindi-language kids dance reality television series, which airs on Sony Entertainment Television and Sony Entertainment Television Asia.  The show is produced by Ranjeet Thakur and Hemant Ruprell for their production house Frames Production.

Concept
The show aims to find a child with the potential to be the future of dance.

After the initial auditions and mega auditions, 12 contestants are selected to be competing for the title of Dance Ka Kal (future of dance). They are each paired with one choreographer who train, choreograph acts and also perform with their contestant. The dancers perform on Saturdays and along with their choreographers on Sunday. The performances are voted by the audience every week on the website or the SonyLiv App. On the basis of the number of votes, one kid is being eliminated every week.

Judges

Series details

Other versions
The show appeared as Super Dancer Nepal in Nepal which is broadcast on Kantipur TV HD, exclusively presented by AD Release.
Super Dancer Maharashtra on Sony Maharashtra

Contestants
 
List of participants of all seasons
Contestant info
Position color key

 Winner
 Runner-up

Notes

References

2016 Indian television series debuts
Hindi-language television shows